Richard Chopping (11 September 1929 – 13 November 1999) was a Canadian field hockey player who competed in the 1964 Summer Olympics.

References

External links
 

1929 births
1999 deaths
Canadian male field hockey players
Olympic field hockey players of Canada
Field hockey players at the 1964 Summer Olympics
Pan American Games competitors for Canada
Field hockey players at the 1967 Pan American Games